Lys-Saint-Georges is a commune in the Indre department in central France.

Geography
The Bouzanne forms the commune's western border.

Population

See also
Communes of the Indre department

References

Communes of Indre